Yuta Ikeda (born 22 December 1985) is a Japanese professional golfer.

Professional career
Ikeda has played on the Japan Golf Tour since 2008. Since his maiden victory in 2009, he has won a minimum of one tournament per season through 2017 and has a total of 21 victories.

Ikeda has featured in the top 50 of the Official World Golf Ranking twice. In late 2009 he reached a high of 33rd. In late 2016/early 2017 he was again 33rd in the rankings.

Amateur wins
2002 Japan Junior Golf Championships
2003 Japan Junior Golf Championships, Junior World Golf Championships

Professional wins (24)

Japan Golf Tour wins (21)

*Note: Tournament shortened to 54 holes due to weather.
1Co-sanctioned by the Asian Tour
 The Japan Open Golf Championship is also a Japan major championship.

Japan Golf Tour playoff record (4–2)

Japan Challenge Tour wins (1)

Other wins (2)
2012 Legend Charity Pro-Am
2013 Legend Charity Pro-Am

Results in major championships

 

CUT = missed the half-way cut
"T" = tied for place

Summary

Most consecutive cuts made – 2 (four times)
Longest streak of top-10s – 0

Results in World Golf Championships
Results not in chronological order prior to 2015.

QF, R16, R32, R64 = Round in which player lost in match play
"T" = tied

Team appearances
Amateur
Eisenhower Trophy (representing Japan): 2004, 2006
Bonallack Trophy (representing Asia/Pacific): 2004 (winners), 2006

Professional
Royal Trophy (representing Asia): 2011
World Cup (representing Japan): 2011
EurAsia Cup (representing Asia): 2018

See also
List of golfers with most Japan Golf Tour wins

References

External links

Japanese male golfers
Japan Golf Tour golfers
Olympic golfers of Japan
Golfers at the 2016 Summer Olympics
Golfers at the 2006 Asian Games
Asian Games competitors for Japan
Universiade medalists in golf
Universiade bronze medalists for Japan
Medalists at the 2007 Summer Universiade
Sportspeople from Chiba Prefecture
1985 births
Living people